The Siena Saints (formerly the Siena Indians) are composed of 21 teams representing Siena College in collegiate sports. The Saints compete in the NCAA Division I and are members of the Metro Atlantic Athletic Conference.

Teams

Discontinued teams

The Siena Saints football program ran from 1965 to 2003.

Siena carried field hockey, which was discontinued following the 2017 season.

References

External links